Cavus may refer to:

 Albus Cavus, an art collective in New Jersey, USA
 Güven Cavus (born 1989), Turkish footballer
 Pes cavus, a human foot type
 Çavuş, an Ottoman title and position

Turkish-language surnames